Subramaniapuram is a 2008 Indian Tamil-language period action film produced, written, and directed by Sasikumar. The low-budget film received critical acclaim for its original script, expert direction, screenplay, editing, fresh music, accurate sets and costumes to resurrect Madurai from the 1980s.

Sasikumar cast then relatively new actors Jai, Swathi, Ganja Karuppu and himself in pivotal roles. Shot in 85 days, it became one of the biggest commercial successes of the year. The movie was dubbed into Malayalam under the same name, into Telugu as Ananthapuram 1980, and remade in Kannada in 2012 as Prem Adda. Director Anurag Kashyap had revealed twice that this film was the inspiration for his Gangs of Wasseypur series - once in 2010 and once on the 10th anniversary of this film. It also marked Swati Reddy’s Tamil film debut.

Plot
The story takes place in the Subramaniapuram area of Madurai city. A convict is released from prison in 2008 after serving 28 years and is stabbed right outside the prison gates. The police are baffled at this as the convict had never spoken to anyone in the prison and refused to meet anyone coming to visit him from the outside during his time in prison. They are shocked about the fact that someone had a grudge against him for 28 years to stab him when he stepped outside prison.

The film then moves to 1980 where Azhagar (Jai), Paraman (M. Sasikumar), Kaasi (Ganja Karuppu), Dopa and Dumka, a polio-stricken physically challenged person, are part of a set of close friends, who are unemployed. They pass their time drinking liquor and fooling around on the streets opposite the house of an ex-councilor Somu and his brother Kanugu (Samuthirakani). Apart from them, the family consists of Somu's wife, their three children including Thulasi (Swathi) and Thulasi's other uncle.

The five friends, particularly Paraman and Azhagu, often end up in jail due to frequent fighting. Cops get a call from someone complaining about the friends each time they do something wrong. Every time they are arrested, Kanugu and Somu bail them out immediately. In the meantime, Azhagu and Thulasi develop mutual feelings for each other. Paraman is against his friend developing feelings for a girl and Azhagu, not heeding to his friends' thoughts, throws up quite a few funny scenes.

There are signs of things to come when Somu is not selected in a local temple's committee for a function. Things take a sudden turn just before intermission when Somu is not elected for his party's (Tamil Nadu's ruling party at the time) district chief post and is ridiculed by his wife for being jobless. This leads Kanugu to lock himself up in a lodge and drink all day. He makes sure the friends hear about him and come to visit. He requests them to murder the person who was chosen for district chief of party post ahead of his brother. Azhagu, Paraman and Kaasi hatch a plan and execute the person almost perfectly. The first half ends here with them running away after the murder leaving a cycle behind.

The second half begins with the cops finding out that Paraman and Azhagu have committed the murder with the help of the cycle they left behind. They surrender themselves before the court hoping that Kanagu will bail them out soon. But they come in for a rude shock when they learn through Kaasi that Somu has been selected for the district chief of party post and is avoiding their contact. They come to terms with reality and stay helpless in jail where they befriend a fellow inmate. He learns their situation and bails them out.

The same friend who aided these guys expects a favor from them — kill his brother-in-law for murdering his sister. Accomplishing this task, these guys now look out for killing Kanugu who cheated them. In the meantime, Thulasi and Azhagu continue to meet up. This leads to Azhagar almost getting killed by Kanugu's men. The friends strike back killing those men later in the day. A few days later they end up hurting Thulasi's uncle in their bid to kill Kanugu. To save his life from the clutches of these buddies, Kanugu sets a trap for Azhagar using Thulasi as bait and kills him using his henchmen. Paraman takes revenge for his friend's death by decapitating Kanugu and laying his head at his friend's murder site. Paraman then calls to Kasi and reveals how he killed Kanugu, during which he sees Somu's henchmen rushing behind Kasi. Kasi betrays Paraman and leaves him at the mercy of the henchmen who kill him.

The story shifts back to the present day where it is revealed the person who was stabbed outside the prison walls is Kasi. He lies in the hospital in critical condition and is being interrogated by a policeman. The doctor intervenes and asks him to leave, after which Dumka comes in and reveals that it is Dopa who stabbed him and then proceeds to remove his air supply and kills him after reminding him of his betrayal.

Cast

Production
It was during the initial phases of Ameer's Paruthiveeran (2007) that Sasikumar began his groundwork for Subramaniapuram and left the production to focus on his film. Sasikumar started collecting old photos, banners and boards of shops to imitate the style of writing from that period and also searched the Internet extensively for photographs of the 80s. He especially researched photographs of wedding processions along the streets for a clear picture of how the roads looked and the kind of vehicles in use. The team relied on this visual information to construct the sets for the film.

Shanthanu Bhagyaraj was approached to play the leading role in the film and Sasikumar began discussions with his father K. Bhagyaraj over Shanthanu's availability. Bhagyaraj had been keen to ensure that Sakkarakatti (2008) was his son's first release, as the team had brought in a prominent producer S. Thanu and musician A. R. Rahman. Sasikumar stated that he was unable to wait for Sakkarakatti'''s release as he had loans to pay and moved ahead without the actor.

Jai, who earlier appeared in Chennai 600028 (2007) was then selected to play a leading role after Sasikumar had seen him at Deva's residence and Jai signed up for the film without hearing the script under the basis that it was to be produced by director Ameer.

MusicSubramaniapuram has five songs composed by James Vasanthan. This is the first time a Tamil movie featured a promotional song. (The song does not feature in the movie but has been released to media). Sasikumar spoke of his apprehension to approach an established music director as he was a debut director himself. 'I was not sure whether they would listen to me and give me what I wanted' he said in an interview. Vasanthan had been Sasikumar's music teacher at St. Peter's boarding school in Kodaikkanal. Sasikumar approached James with the project and the music became a remarkable success. The film brought Vasanthan into prominence with the film's songs and background score gaining fame and being praised and the song "Kangal Irandal" topping the charts and being cited as the "anthem of the year among the youth".

Release and receptionSubramaniapuram was released "two weeks after Kamal Hassan's Dasavatharam". The film was released only in Mini Udhayam but after the film's overwhelming response it later got released in theatres like Shanti and Sathyam Cinemas who were initially wary of releasing this film. The film ran successfully for 100 days. The film's satellite rights was initially sold to Zee Tamil who later resold it to Sun TV. The film had its television premiere on both the channels on the same day. The satellite rights to the Malayalam dubbed version was given to Amrita TV. The film received highly positive response from critics. Sify wrote "Sasikumar should be appreciated for making a bold and daring film, whose success will augur well for the industry. Subramaniapuram may be a bit brooding and dark, but still it's worth taking a look". Rediff wrote "Subramaniyapuram ends as it begins -- naturally, at its own pace. This one is for lovers of realistic cinema."

Legacy
On its 10th anniversary, filmmaker Anurag Kashyap tweeted that this film inspired him to make Gangs of Wasseypur''. The film's screenplay was released as a book in 2014.

References

External links
 

2008 films
Films set in 1980
Tamil films remade in other languages
2000s Tamil-language films
Films scored by James Vasanthan
Indian action drama films
Indian nonlinear narrative films
2008 directorial debut films
2008 action drama films
Period action films